MV NSO Spirit is a supply vessel formerly named Ocean Spirit, Stad Spirit, the Loch Shuna and Far Spirit, built in 1983 at Molde Verft AS.

References

1982 ships